Arbutus canariensis, known in Spanish as madroño canario, is a species of shrub or tree in the heath family. It is endemic to the Canary Islands of Spain, specifically Tenerife, La Gomera, Gran Canaria, El Hierro, and La Palma.  It is threatened by habitat loss.

Hybrids
Arbutus x thuretiana Demoly is a hybrid between A. canariensis and A. andrachne. Named after Gustave Thuret, it is naturalised at Jardin botanique de la Villa Thuret. A. x thuretiana is renowned for its perfectly smooth, reddish-brown bark, exfoliating in the spring to show a new, surprisingly pistachio-green bark, which gradually darkens and turns reddish again.

Gallery

References

External links
Wildscreen Arkive
National Arboretum Canberra (Australia), Arbutus canariensis, Canary Madrone photos and informal information
UK Wildflowers, Arbutus canariensis, Canary Islands Strawberry Tree  photos
Useful Tropical Plants, Arbutus canariensis Images high-quality photos

canariensis
Endemic flora of the Canary Islands
Trees of Africa
Trees of Mediterranean climate
Vulnerable flora of Africa
Plants described in 1800
Taxonomy articles created by Polbot